Euphaedra modesta, the modest Themis forester, is a butterfly in the family Nymphalidae. It is found in north-western Guinea, Ivory Coast and Ghana. The habitat consists of forests.

Adults are attracted to fallen fruit.

The larvae feed on Deinbollia pinnata and Blighia sapida.

References

Butterflies described in 1982
modesta